Antonio Ezeta y León was a Salvadoran military officer and politician who served as the country's vice president from 1891 until his overthrow in 1894.

Biography 

Antonio Ezeta y León's brother was Carlos Ezeta who over President General Francisco Menéndez in June 1885. Ezeta commanded soldiers during the Totoposte War in July 1890. Ezeta was elected as his brother's vice president in the 1891 presidential election, assuming office on 1 March 1891. He was also appointed as commander-in-chief of the army.

During the Revolution of the 44 of April to June 1894, Ezeta was injured by rebel forces on 3 May. He was replaced as commander-in-chief by General León Bolaños until 23 May when he recovered from his injuries. His brother fled the country on 4 June, upon which, he assumed office as acting president. He fled the country for the United States on 10 June, and General Rafael Antonio Gutiérrez became the country's provisional president.

References 

Vice presidents of El Salvador
Date of birth missing
Date of death missing
19th-century Salvadoran people
Leaders ousted by a coup
Salvadoran military personnel